Rooi gevaar is an Afrikaans phrase, sometimes translated into English as "Communist danger". The term gained popularity in South Africa during the Cold War and was associated with the perceived threat of international communism to religious, economic, and political freedom on the Southern African subcontinent. This pretext was used to justify the banning of the South African Communist Party (SACP) and its sister organisation, the African National Congress (ANC), which were regarded as leading anti-apartheid movements. Alternatively, the phrase rooi komplot was also used. 

The term diminished in use after the collapse of the Soviet Union in 1991.

See also

Red Scare
McCarthyism
Swart gevaar ("black threat")

References

External links

20th century in South Africa
Apartheid in South Africa
Apartheid in propaganda
Anti-communist propaganda
Scares
South Africa–Soviet Union relations
Afrikaans words and phrases
Political terminology in South Africa